Sense is the second album by English musical group the Lightning Seeds, released in 1992. It was produced chiefly by Ian Broudie and Simon Rogers.

Background
"The Life of Riley", released as a single in 1992, was written for Broudie's son Riley.

The album's second single, "Sense", was co-written by Broudie and Specials singer and long-time writing partner Terry Hall. The single includes a track written by Broudie and Paul Simpson from their time as Care, "Flaming Sword", as a B-side. Hall released a re-recorded version of "Sense" with himself on vocals in 1994.

In 2009, an instrumental version of "Sense" was used in BMW's Story of Joy advertisement. The instrumental version of "The Life of Riley" also appeared on BBC's Match of the Day, soundtracking football high points.

Critical reception
Trouser Press called the album a "disgruntled production extravaganza" and "a strange achievement but not an unpleasant one". The Washington Post wrote that "the pop-rock sound of the previous album, though not utterly transformed, has become softer, vaguer, more liquid".

Commercial performance
The album reached No. 50 on the UK Albums Chart and the singles, "The Life of Riley" and "Sense", charted at No. 28 and No. 31, respectively.

Track listing
All songs written by Ian Broudie (except where stated).
 "Sense" – 4:12 (Broudie, Terry Hall)
 "The Life of Riley" – 4:05
 "Blowing Bubbles" – 4:16
 "A Cool Place" – 2:57
 "Where Flowers Fade" – 5:03 (Broudie, Hall)
 "A Small Slice of Heaven" – 3:50 (Broudie, Hall)
 "Tingle Tangle" – 3:22
 "Happy" – 4:33 (Broudie, Ian McNabb)
 "Marooned" – 4:40
 "Thinking Up, Looking Down" – 5:19

Personnel

The Lightning Seeds
 Ian Broudie – vocals, all instruments, producer
 Simon Rogers – all instruments, producer

Production
 Cenzo Townshend – engineer
 Phil Ault – additional engineer
 Simon Dawson – additional engineer
 Bob Ludwig – mastering

Additional musicians
 Mark Feltham – harmonica
 Alan Dunn – accordion
 Clive Layton – Hammond organ
 Roddy Lorimer – trumpet
 Terry Hall – backing vocals
 Juliet Roberts – backing vocals
 Ian McNabb – backing vocals

Other personnel
 Peter Ashworth – photography

Charts

Certifications
 United Kingdom (BPI): Silver (1 July 1997)

References

1992 albums
The Lightning Seeds albums
Albums produced by Ian Broudie
Virgin Records albums